The Unauthorised Breakfast Item is the thirteenth studio album by progressive rock band Caravan, released in 2003.

Track listing
All songs by Pye Hastings, except "Nowhere to Hide" (Dave Sinclair), "Linders Field" (Doug Boyle) and "For Richard... Live in Quebec City" (Richard Coughlan, Pye Hastings, Dave Sinclair and Richard Sinclair).

Disc one

Disc two

Personnel
 Pye Hastings – lead vocals, guitars
 Geoffrey Richardson – viola, banjo, ukulele, acoustic guitar, backing vocals
 Doug Boyle – lead guitar
 Jan Schelhaas – keyboards, backing vocals
 Jim Leverton – bass, backing vocals; lead vocals on "Nowhere to Hide"
 Richard Coughlan – drums

Additional personnel
 Jimmy Hastings – tenor and soprano saxophone, flute
 David Sinclair – keyboards on "Nowhere to Hide"
 Simon Bentall – percussion
 Ralph Cross – additional percussion on "The Unauthorised Breakfast Item"

References

External links
 
 
 Caravan - The Unauthorised Breakfast Item (2003) album to be listened as stream at Play.Spotify.com

Caravan (band) albums
2007 albums